This is a list of brand name snack foods. A snack or snack food is a portion of food often smaller than a regular meal, generally eaten between meals. Snacks come in a variety of forms including packaged and processed foods and items made from fresh ingredients at home.

Brand name snack foods

Asia

Europe

Oceania

A
 Adyar Ananda Bhavan A2B brand in South India

B

C

D

 
  (chocolate)

E

F

G

H

I

J

K

L

M

N

 
  (British snack)
  (South African snack)

O

P

Q
 
Quaker

R

S

T

 
 
 
  (Northern Ireland)
  (Republic of Ireland)

U

W

Y

Z

See also

Convenience food
List of brand name food products
List of brand name soft drink products
List of breakfast cereals
List of confectionery brands
List of frozen dessert brands
List of frozen food brands
List of ice cream brands
List of instant noodle brands
List of Japanese snacks
List of popcorn brands
List of pretzel companies
List of snack foods
List of snack foods by country
List of snack foods from the Indian subcontinent
Snacking

References

External links
 

Brand name snack foods
Confectionery by country
Snack foods
Snack foods by country